Sarah Elizabeth Daggett Morrison (born November 12, 1970) is a United States district judge of the United States District Court for the Southern District of Ohio.

Early life and education 

Morrison was born on November 12, 1970, in Lufkin, Texas. She received her Bachelor of Arts from the Ohio State University and her Juris Doctor, magna cum laude, from the Capital University Law School, where she was inducted into the Order of the Curia and served as an associate editor of the Capital University Law Review.

Legal career 

After graduation from law school, Morrison served as a law clerk to Judge John David Holschuh of the United States District Court for the Southern District of Ohio. Before entering state service, she was a partner in the Columbus, Ohio office of Taft Stettinius & Hollister, where she practiced complex civil and commercial litigation. Prior to her appointment as Administrator, she served for four years as the General Counsel and Chief Ethics Officer of the Ohio Bureau of Workers' Compensation. From 2016 to 2019 she served as the Administrator and Chief Executive Officer of the Ohio Bureau of Workers' Compensation, where she oversaw the investment of $25 billion and an agency staff of 1,800.

Federal judicial service 

On April 10, 2018, President Donald Trump announced his intent to nominate Morrison to serve as a United States District Judge of the United States District Court for the Southern District of Ohio. On April 12, 2018, her nomination was sent to the Senate. She was nominated to the seat vacated by Judge Gregory L. Frost, who retired on May 2, 2016. On October 10, 2018, a hearing on her nomination was held before the Senate Judiciary Committee.

On January 3, 2019, her nomination was returned to the President under Rule XXXI, Paragraph 6 of the Senate. On January 23, 2019, President Trump announced his intent to renominate Morrison for a federal judgeship. Her nomination was sent to the Senate later that day. On February 7, 2019, her nomination was reported out of committee by a voice vote. On June 10, 2019, the Senate voted 89–7 to invoke cloture on the nomination. On June 11, 2019, the Senate confirmed her nomination by a 89–7 vote. She received her judicial commission on June 14, 2019.

References

External links 

Biography at Columbus Bar Association

1970 births
Living people
20th-century American lawyers
21st-century American judges
21st-century American lawyers
Capital University Law School alumni
Judges of the United States District Court for the Southern District of Ohio
Ohio lawyers
Ohio State University alumni
People from Lufkin, Texas
United States district court judges appointed by Donald Trump
20th-century American women lawyers
21st-century American women lawyers
21st-century American women judges